Jeanne de Flandreysy, born Jeanne Mellier (11 July 1874 – 15 May 1959) was a French author and literary critic. She was the author of many books about Provence, and she promoted Franco-Italian cultural exchanges.

Early life
Jeanne de Flandreysy was born Jeanne Mellier on 11 July 1874 in Valence, Drôme, France. Her father, Étienne Mellier, was an archaeologist.

Career
De Flandreysy began her career as a contributor to La Revue Dauphinoise. She was a literary critic for Le Figaro from 1904 to 1910.

De Flandreysy was an author. She was close to the Félibrige, and some of her books were prefaced by them. For example, her 1903 book entitled La Vénus d'Arles et le Museon Arlaten was prefaced by Frédéric Mistral, while her 1924 book entitled La maison de Baroncelli en Italie du Xe au XVe siècle was prefaced by Charles Maurras. Meanwhile, her 1943 poetry collection was prefaced by Folco de Baroncelli-Javon. In 1958, she translated poems in Provençal about Saintes-Maries-de-la-Mer composed by Baroncelli-Javon and Mistral into French.

De Flandreysy was a significant collector of books and manuscripts about Provence and Italy. She was a member of the Comité France-Italie. With Jules Charles-Roux, she helped Frédéric Mistral establish a gallery with statues from the Antiquity found on the grounds of the Museon Arlaten. She was also the co-founder of the Musée-bibliothèque François Pétrarque in Fontaine-de-Vaucluse in 1927.

De Flandreysy became a Knight of the Legion of Honour in 1953.

Personal life

De Flandreysy purchased the Palais du Roure, a hôtel particulier in Avignon in 1918. Having met Benito Mussolini twice, she hung his portrait above the chimney in her lounge.

De Flandreysy married Émile Espérandieu, an archaeologist and epigrapher, on September 8, 1936.

Death and legacy
De Flandreysy died on 15 May 1959 in Avignon.

De Flandreysy bequeathed her Palais du Roure to the town of Avignon; it was renamed the Institut méditerranéen du palais du Roure, run by Aix-Marseille University.

The Espace Jeanne de Flandreysy in Valence was named in her honour.

Works

Posthumously

Further reading

References

1874 births
1959 deaths
People from Valence, Drôme
French literary critics
Women literary critics
French non-fiction writers
20th-century French poets
French women poets
French women critics
French translators
French book and manuscript collectors
Chevaliers of the Légion d'honneur
20th-century French women writers